Elethyia albirufalis is a moth in the family Crambidae. It was described by George Hampson in 1919. It is found in Sudan.

References

Endemic fauna of Sudan
Ancylolomiini
Moths described in 1919